The Korean War Memorial is a monument commemorating those who fought in the Korean War, installed outside the Veterans Building in Salem, Oregon, United States, which houses the offices of the Oregon Department of Veterans' Affairs.

See also
 List of Korean War memorials

References

Korean War memorials and cemeteries
Monuments and memorials in Salem, Oregon
Outdoor sculptures in Salem, Oregon